Monofatsi was a province of Heraklion Prefecture, Crete, Greece. Its territory corresponded with that of the current municipal units Asterousia and Kofinas, and parts of the municipal units Agia Varvara, Arkalochori and Nikos Kazantzakis. It was abolished in 2006.

References

Heraklion (regional unit)
Provinces of Greece